Sanarovka (Üstügi-Aytı-Kool) is a rural locality (a selo) in Ust-Kansky District, the Altai Republic, Russia. The population was 106 as of 2016. There are 2 streets.

Geography 
Sanarovka is located 47 km northwest of Ust-Kan (the district's administrative centre) by road. Talitsa is the nearest rural locality.

References 

Rural localities in Ust-Kansky District